The ON convoys were a series of North Atlantic trade convoys running Outbound from the British Isles to North America during the Battle of the Atlantic.

History
From 7 September 1939, shortly after the outbreak of World War II, OB convoys sailed from Liverpool south through St George's Channel to the open Atlantic.  Off Land's End the convoy would be joined by an OA convoy from London on the River Thames via the English Channel.  The combined OA/OB convoys were escorted for about four days to get beyond the range of U-boat patrols before the ships dispersed to reach their individual destinations. After the fall of France in June 1940, OA and OB convoys sailed north to join in the Western Approaches. As German aircraft, submarines, and surface ships reached further into the Atlantic, ships formerly assigned to OA/OB convoys were formed into ON convoys sailing from Liverpool via the North Channel and escorted all the way to Halifax Harbour.  These convoys were sequentially numbered from ON 1 sailing on 26 July 1941 to ON 305 sailing on 27 May 1945.

From August 1942, the Mid-Ocean Escort Force of British and Canadian ships (with a few United States Coast Guard cutters) delivered ON convoys to the Royal Canadian Navy Western Local Escort Force (WLEF) off Halifax; and the WLEF escorted most convoys from ON 125 through ON 301 to New York City.

Most ships in ON convoys were in ballast, although some carried coal or other export goods. A total of 14,864 ships sailed in 307 ON convoys.  One ON convoy sailed in Fast and Slow sections and two others were cancelled. U-boats sank 81 of these ships, and another 23 were lost to marine accidents.  These figures do not include stragglers; although the majority of casualties to U-boats were ships that had fallen out of convoys or were sailing independently. Ten warships on escort duty were also lost.

Slow convoys
This situation, which has proved confusing to modern historians, prevailed until a new and separate series of ONS (Outbound North Slow) convoys was organised. These convoys were sequentially numbered from ONS 1 sailing on 4 April 1943 to ONS 51 sailing on 21 May 1945. ON 171 was a fast convoy, as were all subsequent ON convoys. The ONS series were suspended in the summer of 1944 as escort groups were diverted to cover the Normandy landings. A total of 1873 ships sailed in 51 ONS convoys. Only 5 of these were attacked (around 10%), though two of these battles were of major significance; ONS 5 is regarded as the turning point of the campaign, while ONS 18 was the last major convoy battle in the campaign. Nineteen ships were lost (around 1%) from ONS convoys.

Notable battles around ON and ONS convoys
The Outbound Northern convoys saw some of the major convoy battles of the Atlantic campaign; of the 40 convoys which lost 6 or more ships, 8 were in the ON series (of which 5 were Slow, and 3 were Fast) and one was in the ONS series.

 Convoy ON 67 was one of the few North Atlantic trade convoy of early 1942 to be attacked by multiple U-boats.
 Convoy ON 92
 Convoy ON 122 was the first to illustrate the defensive value of HF/DF and type 271 centimeter-wavelength radar.
 Convoy ON 127 was the only North Atlantic trade convoy of 1942 or 1943 where all U-boats deployed against the convoy launched torpedoes.
 Convoy ON 144 demonstrated the ability of s equipped with type 271 centimeter-wavelength radar.
 Convoy ON 154 included the last Q-ship operation by the Royal Navy.  Loss of 486 lives with 14 ships during the "Christmas Convoy" of December 1942 caused re-evaluation of Canadian convoy escorts.
 Convoy ON 166. Attacked in late February, 1943, ON 166 lost 13 merchant ships and the Convoy rescue ship Stockport.  Three U-boats were destroyed and the USCG  leading Escort Group A-3 was disabled.
 Convoy ONS 5. Attacked in April–May 1943, ONS 5 saw the loss of 12 ships, and the destruction of 6 U-boats, in a week-long series of actions. It ushered in the period known as Black May and is widely regarded as the turning point in the Atlantic campaign.
 Convoys ONS 18/ON 202. Attacked in September 1943, these two convoys saw the loss of 6 ships and 3 escorts, for the destruction of 3 U-boats, in the first battle of KM's autumn offensive after Black May.

Notes

References
 
 
 Dan van der Vat. The Atlantic Campaign (1988). 
 Arnold Hague. The Allied Convoy System 1939–1945 (2000). ISBN (Canada) 1 55125 033 0 . ISBN (UK) 1 86176 147 3
 
 
 
 

ON 0